Yasunori Uchitomi (born 29 October 1972), is a Japanese former long-distance runner who specialised in the 3000 metres steeplechase. His personal best for the event is 8:26.48 minutes, set in 1997.

He was one of Japan's top steeplechasers during his career, taking three titles at the Japan Championships in Athletics and six at the Japanese National Games. His greatest achievement was a gold medal at the 1998 Asian Games, having won bronze four years earlier. He was twice a medallist at the Asian Athletics Championships (silver in 1998, bronze in 2003). He had much success at the East Asian Games, winning back-to-back titles in 1997 to 2001 with games record times before finally taking silver in 2005 (his last international performance).

Uchitomi also represented Japan at the IAAF World Cross Country Championships in 1999 and was a corporate team runner for Chugoku Electric Power Company, winning several Japan corporate titles.

Career
Uchitomi established himself at national level in 1993 when he won the 1500 metres title at the Japanese National Games. He had his first successes in the 3000 metres steeplechase during the 1994 track season. He set a personal best of 8:33.04 minutes at the Japan Championships in Athletics, then went on to take his first major medal at the 1994 Asian Games, held in Hiroshima. He won the national title in the steeplechase for the first time in 1995. He retained that title the following year with a personal best run of 8:30.16 minutes and also took the Japanese Games title in the event that year.

Uchitomi reached his athletic peak in 1997 and set lifetime bests of 3:43.13 minutes for the 1500 m and 8:26.48 minutes for the steeplechase (the latter mark coming as part of another National Games win). A steeplechase gold medal at the 1997 East Asian Games in a games record marked his first international title in the sport. His run of success in the steeplechase continued into 1998. First he took the silver medal at the 1998 Asian Athletics Championships in Fukuoka, finishing behind Saudi Arabia's Saad Al-Asmari. At the FBK Games in Hengelo he ran the second fastest time of his career at 8:28.04 minutes. His form maintained until December, he took the highest accolade of his career at the 1998 Asian Games with a gold medal-winning performance.

He made his international debut on grass at the 1999 IAAF World Cross Country Championships, but was outside of the top 100 of the men's short race. He was runner-up at the Japanese Championships that year, but returned to the fore in 2000 with wins at both the national championships and games. The emergence of Yoshitaka Iwamizu at the 2001 Japanese Championships marked a generational change. Although Uchitomi ran a time of 8:29.63 minutes (third best in his career), he was beaten by Iwamizu, who would go on to win five consecutive titles. Uchitomi defended his title at the 2001 East Asian Games and improved his own games record to 8:33.98 minutes, beating compatriot Wataru Izumi into second place as he had in 1997. He also took the steeplechase title for the Chugoku Electric Power Company at the All-Japan Corporate Track and Field Championships.

Running for his corporate team, helped Chugoku Electric to second place at the New Year Ekiden in January 2002. He won the corporate steeplechase title for a second year running, but was again runner-up at the national championships. He aimed to defend his title at the 2002 Asian Games but finished outside the medals in fifth place – his time of 8:41.02 minutes being his fastest that year. He showed strong form at the 2002 Japanese Championships with a run of 8:30.52 minutes behind Iwamizu. He was back within the major medals at the 2003 Asian Athletics Championships, where he took bronze in a tactic race as Japan's sole representative. He ended the year with victories at the corporate championships and the Japanese Games.

His 2004 season did not feature any major competitions and he placed in the top three nationally. He had his last international outings the year after, coming fourth at the 2005 Asian Athletics Championships and taking the silver medal at the 2005 East Asian Games, missing out on a third straight title due to his national rival Iwamizu. He won his sixth, and final, steeplechase title at the Japanese National Games that October. Reaching his mid-thirties, he had his last season in 2006 after finishing out of the top ten at the national championships.

International competitions

National titles
Japanese National Games (6 titles): 1996, 1997, 2000, 2001, 2003, 2005
Japan Championships in Athletics (4 titles)
1500 metres: 1993
3000 m steeplechase: 1995, 1996, 2000

Personal bests
1500 metres – 3:43.13 min (1997)
3000 metres – 7:56.53 min (1998)
5000 metres – 13:37.80 min (2001)
10,000 metres – 28:55.00 min (2000)
Half marathon – 62:52 min (2003)
3000 metres steeplechase – 8:26.48 min (1997)

References

External links

Living people
1972 births
Japanese male middle-distance runners
Japanese male long-distance runners
Japanese male steeplechase runners
Japanese male cross country runners
Asian Games gold medalists for Japan
Asian Games bronze medalists for Japan
Asian Games medalists in athletics (track and field)
Athletes (track and field) at the 1994 Asian Games
Athletes (track and field) at the 1998 Asian Games
Athletes (track and field) at the 2002 Asian Games
Medalists at the 1994 Asian Games
Medalists at the 1998 Asian Games
Japan Championships in Athletics winners